This is a list of Honorary Fellows of St Antony's College, University of Oxford.

 Sir Mark Allen
 Nayef Al-Rodhan
 Hanan Ashrawi
 Aung San Suu Kyi
 Sir Raymond Carr
 Peter Carington, 6th Baron Carrington
 Sir Bryan Cartledge
 Sir James Craig
 Norman Davies
 Guido di Tella
 Thomas Friedman
 Sir Alistair Horne
 Michael Ignatieff
 Jin Yong
 Bridget Kendall
 Paul Kennedy
 Nemir Kirdar
 Jürgen Kocka
 Sir Michael Llewellyn-Smith
 Wm. Roger Louis
 Margaret MacMillan
 José María Maravall Herrero
 David Marquand
 Sadako Ogata
 Christopher Patten, Baron Patten of Barnes
 Sigrid Rausing
 Gerhard A. Ritter
 Sir Adam Roberts
 Dame Nemak Shafik
 Alfred Stepan
 Sir John Swire
 Romila Thapar
 Richard von Weizsäcker
 Sir Denis Wright

Honorary
Saint Antony's College